Prospect Beresteiskyi,  is the second longest public roadway (prospekt) in Kyiv, Ukraine. The roadway was created in the second half of the 20th century (1964) as part of the urbanized area of the Brest-Lytovske highway and was known as Brest-Lytovskyi prospect. At the beginning of the Soviet perestroika period in 1985, it was renamed to Prospect Peremohy. It gained its current name in February 2023.

History
Originally being terminated at the Povitroflotskyi overpass, in 1985, when it was renamed, the prospect was extended all the way to the Halytska Square which until 1985 was part of boulevard Tarasa Shevchenka.

Through Halytska Square and boulevard Tarasa Shevchenka, the roadway reaches Khreshchatyk at Bessarabska Square.

Along the streets are located various important institutions of government, education and culture. 

It is part of the former  business route (currently rerouted along the Kyiv Great Ring Road). Along the prospect are located several overpasses and bridges (Povitroflotskyi, Shuliavskyi, over the Railway crossing, Kovelskyi, over the Great Ring road, and Havanskyi bridge). There are also six metro stations of the Sviatoshynsko–Brovarska line as well as three railway stations.

Significant buildings
 #10 – Ministry of Education and Science
 #14 – Ministry of Infrastructure
 #13 – Sky Towers
 #32 – Kyiv Zoo
 #34 – Bogomolets National Medical University
 #37 – Igor Sikorsky Kyiv Polytechnic Institute
 #44 – Dovzhenko Film Studios
 #49/2 – Bilshovyk Factory (formerly Greter and Kryvanek Co.)
 #50 – "Presa Ukrayiny" Publishing
 #54 – Hetman National Economic University
 #67 – Kyiv Machinebuilding Factory "Verkon"
 #82 – Park "Nyvky"
 #83 – ATEK
 #97 – Svyatoshynskyi District Administration (Kyiv city)
 #100 – Antonov Serial Production Plant (formerly Aviant)
 #126 – Kyiv-Sviatoshyn Raion Administration

References

External links 
 Prospect Peremohy (Перемоги проспект). Kyiv Web Encyclopaedia.  

Streets in Kyiv
 
Shevchenkivskyi District, Kyiv
Sviatoshynskyi District
Solomianskyi District